The A2 motorway is a national motorway in North Macedonia. It forms part of the European route E65 (E65), connecting the cities of Skopje and Tetovo.

Route
Beginning from the Skopje airport interchange of the A1 Motorway, it connects the aforementioned motorway with the city of Tetovo, forming a partial beltway around Skopje. The Skopje beltway is also part of the M-4 Motorway, which follows another route thereafter. Leaving Skopje, it continues to Tetovo. Gostivar is about 19 km south and it can be easily reached, using the expressway part of the road. This part is just like the rest of the A2, but it does not feature an emergency lane and it does not meet some other motorway requirements.

Pictures

Future plans
The existing Kičevo - Ohrid single carriageway road will be turned into a motorway with 4 traffic lanes. This section is currently under construction. After completion, it will form part of the A2.

References

Motorways in North Macedonia
Pan-European Corridor VIII